The 1997 Maui Invitational Tournament was an early-season college basketball tournament that was played, for the 14th time, from November 24 to November 26, 1997. The tournament, which began in 1984, was part of the 1997-98 NCAA Division I men's basketball season.  The tournament was played at the Lahaina Civic Center in Maui, Hawaii and was won by the Duke Blue Devils. It was the second title for both the program and for its head coach Mike Krzyzewski.

Bracket

References

Maui Invitational Tournament
Maui Invitational